The Pride is a British drama by Alexi Kaye Campbell that counterpoints two parallel love stories.

Productions
In 2008 The Pride premiered at the Royal Court Theatre to critical acclaim, winning the Laurence Olivier Award under the direction of Jamie Lloyd and starring Bertie Carvel, JJ Feild and Lyndsey Marshal.

It made its US premiere Off-broadway in the MCC Theater production at the Lucille Lortel Theatre in February 2010 starring Hugh Dancy, Andrea Riseborough and Ben Whishaw and directed by Joe Mantello. The play was nominated for the 2010 Drama League Award, Outstanding Production of a Play and 2010 Outer Critics Circle Award, Outstanding New Off-Broadway Play.

In 2011, the play made its Japanese premiere in Theatre Project Tokyo production at d-soko theatre in Tokyo, starring Takamasa Suga, Erika Mabuchi, Makiya Yamaguchi and Ayumi Tanida, directed by Eriko Ogawa.

In 2012 The Pride made its Australian debut at Red Stitch Actors Theatre, starring Lyall Brooks, Ben Geurens and Ngaire Dawn Fair under Gary Abrahams' direction.

The play was revived in London at Trafalgar Studios in 2013.

The play was produced in Seoul, South Korea at the Art One Theater in 2014, directed by Kim Dong-yeon.

On 27 June 2022, Ambassador Theatre Group produced a one-off script in hand performance of The Pride at the Fortune Theatre starring Omari Douglas, Jordan Luke Gage, Lauryn Redding, Daniel Bailey, Michelle Tiwo and Josh-Susan Enright. The performance celebrated 50 years since the UK's first gay pride rally.

Cast and characters

References

External links
MCC Theater
In Korean

LGBT-related plays
2008 plays
British plays